Krzysztof Józef Mikuła (born 3 July 1974 in Katowice) is a Polish politician. He was elected to the Sejm on 25 September 2005, getting 10,208 votes in 31 Katowice district as a candidate from the Law and Justice list.

See also
Members of Polish Sejm 2005-2007

External links
Krzysztof Mikuła - parliamentary page - includes declarations of interest, voting record, and transcripts of speeches.

1974 births
Living people
Politicians from Katowice
Members of the Polish Sejm 2005–2007
Law and Justice politicians